The 2009 Sudirman Cup (World Mixed Team Badminton Championships) was held in the Guangzhou Gymnasium in China from May 10 to May 17, 2009, having been arranged in December 2005. It was the eleventh contest.

Guangzhou has a tradition of staging badminton tournaments (The China Open was held in Guangzhou from 2005 to 2007, Thomas and Uber Cup in 2002 as well). The Sudirman Cup is part of the city's campaign of "hosting a major sporting event every year" in the run up to the 2010 Asian Games, which will be held in the same city.

China defeated Korea to win the title for the seventh time.

Host city selection
Guangzhou is the only bidder for this event and later selected to host the tournament by Badminton World Federation during a council meeting in Kuala Lumpur. Denmark and India also expressed interest in hosting the event.

Venue
Guangzhou Gymnasium

Group 1

Play-offs

Final Stage
Semi-final

Final

Group 2

Play-offs

Group 3

Play-offs

Group 4

Play-offs

Final classification

References

External links
2009 Sudirman Cup at tournamentsoftware.com

Sudirman Cup
Sudirman Cup
Sudirman Cup
2009 Sudirman Cup
International sports competitions hosted by China